Abubaker Ali Kamal (born 8 November 1983) is a Qatari runner who has specialized mostly in the 1500 metres and 3000 metres steeplechase.

He won a 5000 m/steeplechase double at the 2011 Pan Arab Games, but failed a drugs test at the competition. He was disqualified and banned for two years for being positive for Erythropoietin (EPO).

Achievements

Personal bests
Outdoor
 800 metres – 1:46.38 min (2006)
 1500 metres – 3:36.15 min (2010)
 3000 metres – 7:55.95 min (2006)
 3000 metres steeplechase – 8:15.80 min (2008)
 5000 metres – 13:25.51  min (2014)

Indoor
 800 metres – 1:49.21 min (2009)
 1500 metres – 3:41.69 min (2009)

See also
 List of doping cases in athletics

References

External links
 

1983 births
Living people
Qatari male steeplechase runners
Qatari male middle-distance runners
Qatari male long-distance runners
Qatari male marathon runners
Olympic athletes of Qatar
Athletes (track and field) at the 2008 Summer Olympics
Doping cases in athletics
Qatari sportspeople in doping cases
Asian Games gold medalists for Qatar
Asian Games silver medalists for Qatar
Asian Games medalists in athletics (track and field)
Athletes (track and field) at the 2002 Asian Games
Athletes (track and field) at the 2006 Asian Games
Athletes (track and field) at the 2014 Asian Games
Medalists at the 2002 Asian Games
Medalists at the 2014 Asian Games